The 1977 Columbia Lions football team was an American football team that represented Columbia University during the 1977 NCAA Division I football season. Columbia tied for last place in the Ivy League. 

In their fourth season under head coach William Campbell, the Lions compiled a 2–7 record and were outscored 222 to 149. Paul McCormick, Jack Gastler, Marty Fischer and Steve Elliot were the team captains.  

The Lions' 1–6 conference record tied for seventh in the Ivy League standings. Columbia was outscored 164 to 92 by Ivy opponents. 

Columbia played its home games at Baker Field in Upper Manhattan, in New York City.

Schedule

References

Columbia
Columbia Lions football seasons
Columbia Lions football